Julie Mathiesen Scaglione (born 20 August 2004) is a Danish handball player who plays for  Ikast Håndbold in the Damehåndboldligaen and the Danish national team.

She also represented Denmark in the 2021 European Women's U-17 Handball Championship, placing 4. Scaglione was also included in the official All-Star team for tournament, as best left back.

She made her debut on the Danish national team on 9 June 2022 against Slovenia. She was also selected as part of the Danish 35-player squad for the 2021 World Women's Handball Championship in Spain.

Achievements 
Damehåndboldligaen:
Bronze Medalist: 2021, 2022

Individual awards 
 Best left back of the EHF European Under-17 Championship: 2021
 Best left back of the Youth World Championship: 2022

References

2004 births
Living people
Danish female handball players
Sportspeople from the Central Denmark Region